Michèle Cournoyer (born November 14, 1943) is a Canadian animator who on 1 March 2017 received a Governor General’s Award in Visual and Media Arts for her body of work.

Early life 
Born in Saint-Joseph-de-Sorel, Quebec, Cournoyer began drawing at the age of five, and started painting at 12 when she was hospitalized, and her father bought her an oil paint set. At the age of 17, she had to halt her art education when her mother became ill, with Cournoyer caring for her ailing mother and the family. Her mother died when Cournoyer was 20 years of age. After two years studying in Quebec City, she moved to Montreal, then to London to study graphic arts.  Studying in London during the 1960s, she was influenced by Pop Art, the Dada movement and surrealism. During the 1970s she worked as a set designer, art director, costume designer and screenwriter for several Quebec-based film companies.

Independent film and animation work
Her first animation film, Papa! Papa! Papa! (L'Homme et l'enfant), came about when a friend had a baby and Cournoyer, fascinated by the relationship between parent and child, created a photography flip book that would evolve into this film. Her 1973 short Alfredo was made during her time in Italy. Upon returning to Quebec, she worked in film as a set designer, art director, costume designer and screenwriter, with credits on such films as Mireille Dansereau’s La vie rêvée (1972) and L’arrache-coeur (1979), as well as Gilles Carle’s La Mort d’un bûcheron (1973). She also made her independent films Spaghettata, Toccata, Old Orchard Beach, P.Q.  and Dolorosa.

Working with the NFB
In 1989, Cournoyer won the National Film Board of Canada's French Animation Studio's 9th Cinéaste recherché competition in 1989, leading to the completion of her first NFB animated short A Feather Tale. Her films with the NFB have explored powerful themes. The Hat is a film about incest that was part of the International Critics' Week during the Cannes Film Festival, and was ranked as one of the 100 Best Animated Films of All Time in Variety 2005 survey. Accordion deals with sexuality, while Robes of War looks at terrorism and religion through a female suicide bomber. Her 2014 film, Soif explores alcoholism.

Technique
While she has experimented with computerization in such works as An Artist (1994), Cournoyer usually uses traditional animation methods. The Hat, which started on a computer, was completed by her on paper. Soif, an ink-on-paper film, took her four years, with 10,000 drawings required to arrive at the final 1,800 used in the film. She traditionally makes her drawings in pen with black ink, on white pages in black note books.

Filmography
Papa! Papa! Papa! (L'Homme et l'enfant), 1969
Alfredo, 1973
Spaghettata (co-directed with Jacques Drouin), 1976
La Toccata, 1976
Old Orchard Beach P. Q., 1981
Dolorasa, 1988
A Feather Tale (La Basse-cour), 1992
An Artist (Une Artiste), 1994
The Hat (Le Chapeau), 1999
The Accordion, 2004
Robes of War (Robe de guerre), 2008
Soif, 2014

Honours
In 2015, she was the subjective of a special retrospective and art exhibition at the Ottawa International Animation Film Festival. On February 27, Cournoyer was announced as a recipient of a 2017 Governor General's Award in Visual and Media Arts.

References

External links
 
 Watch films by Michèle Cournoyer at NFB.ca

1943 births
Living people
Film directors from Quebec
Canadian women artists
National Film Board of Canada people
Canadian animated film directors
Canadian women film directors
Feminist artists
Canadian women animators
Artists from Quebec
French Quebecers
People from Montérégie
Governor General's Award in Visual and Media Arts winners
Prix Albert-Tessier winners